Kushk-e Amir ol Momeyin (also Romanized as Kūshk-e Amīr ol Momeyīn; also known as Kūshk) is a village in Dehdasht-e Gharbi Rural District, in the Central District of Kohgiluyeh County, Kohgiluyeh and Boyer-Ahmad Province, Iran. At the 2006 census, its population was 97, in 20 families.

References 

Populated places in Kohgiluyeh County